The streaming vibration current (SVI) and the associated streaming vibration potential is an electric signal that arises when an acoustic wave propagates through a porous body in which the pores are filled with fluid.

Streaming vibration current was experimentally observed in 1948 by M. Williams. A theoretical model was developed some 30 years later by Dukhin and coworkers. This effect opens another possibility for characterizing the electric properties of the surfaces in porous bodies.

See also
Interface and colloid science

References

Chemical mixtures
Colloidal chemistry
Soft matter